The Hibiscus Apartments (also known as the Hibiscus Garden Apartments) was a historic site in West Palm Beach, Florida.  It was a 3-story Mediterranean style apartment building built in 1926.

The building was destroyed in the early 2000s for the development of City Place shopping district in downtown West Palm Beach.  Macy's currently occupies the space where the Hibiscus Apartments once existed.  It was located at 619 Hibiscus Street and on May 10, 1984, it was added to the U.S. National Register of Historic Places.

References

External links
 Palm Beach County listings at National Register of Historic Places
 Palm Beach County listings at Florida's Office of Cultural and Historical Programs

National Register of Historic Places in Palm Beach County, Florida
Apartment buildings in Florida
Residential buildings on the National Register of Historic Places in Florida
1926 establishments in Florida
Residential buildings completed in 1926